Suck were a rock band who were part of South Africa's first wave of hard rock titled "The Big Heavies". The group lasted eight months between 1970 and 1971, during which they recorded their lone LP, Time to Suck. It was later released in America in 2009. They were also one of the earliest groups to cover Black Sabbath. In March 2007 they were featured in an article in Classic Rock magazine titled "The Lost Pioneers of Heavy Metal", where they were referred to as "acidpunk metal".

Discography
Time to Suck (1971)
"Aimless Lady" b/w "The Whip" (1971)
Rock Today With the Big Heavies! (1972 – Suck contributed "War Pigs")

Personnel 
 Andrew Ioannides (South African citizen) – vocals, flute
 Stephen Gilroy (British citizen) – guitar
 Louis Forer (South African citizen) – bass
 Saverio Grande (Italian citizen) – drums

References
Christe, Ian (2003). Sound of the Beast: The Complete Headbanging History of Heavy Metal. HarperCollins.

Notes

South African progressive rock groups
South African heavy metal musical groups
South African hard rock musical groups